Joachim von Heydebreck (6 October 1861 – 12 November 1914) was a German military officer who was born in Schwedt and grew up in Zützen. He was the son of Prussian Lieutenant General Henning von Heydebreck (1828–1904) and his wife  Anna von Colmar (1837–1879). 

Heydebreck was a member of the Grenadier-Regiment Prinz Karl, and in 1893 was sent to serve in colonial German Southwest Africa. He was in charge of an artillery division during the Herero Wars, and in 1911 became commanding officer of the Schutztruppe. During the early stages of World War I, after leading German forces to success at the Battle of Sandfontein, he died from an accidental explosion of a rifle grenade in Kalkfontein-Süd. Heydebreck was succeeded as commander of the Schutztruppe by Victor Franke.

References 
 Biographies of Namibian Personalities by Klaus Dierks

External links
 

German military personnel killed in World War I
Colonial people in German South West Africa
History of Namibia
1861 births
1914 deaths
Prussian Army personnel
People from Schwedt
People from the Province of Brandenburg
Schutztruppe personnel
Deaths by hand grenade